Edhem "Etko" Šljivo  (born 16 March 1950 in Sarajevo) is a former Bosnian footballer and Yugoslav international. He started his career with FK Sarajevo, going on to become one of the best midfielders of the Yugoslav First League.

Club career
Edhem Šljivo joined FK Sarajevo as a kid from elementary school, passed through all club's age categories, and made his first senior team debut at the age of 18. He played 424 games for the club in all competitions, counting friendlies. In Yugoslav First League and Yugoslav Cup he played for the club 268 games scoring 37 times. 

In 1978, he joined Belgian side RFC de Liège, whom he represented for three seasons. He made his debut for them 30 August 1978 against Winterslag and later made a move to the French Ligue 1 and joined OGC Nice. From Nice he moved to 1. FC Köln on personal insistence of Rinus Michels and after winning the German cup (the first Bosnian to do so) he moved back to Liège. There he concluded his career in 1987 after a traffic collision on 17 December 1986, in which he was severely injured. Šljivo barely survived a life threatening spinal injuries after 40 days of doctors' struggle to save him. His final game for Liège was on 14 December 1986 against Berchem Sport.

Career statistic & transfers

German cup

UEFA Europa League (UEFA Cup)

International career

Šljivo debuted for the Yugoslavia national team on 18 February 1976 in a friendly match away against Tunisia. He was capped in 12 official games (4 friendlies, 5 qualifiers for the 1982 FIFA World Cup, and all 3 '82 world cup games) and scored 2 goals, while also featuring in 2 unofficial exhibition-friendlies, 14 games overall. He was first-team regular at play-making midfielder position under Miljan Miljanić, and featured in the same role in 1982 World Cup in Spain.His final international was a June 1982 World Cup match against Honduras.

National team statistic

Personal life and legacy
Šljivo lives and works in Liege, Belgium, where he opened a restaurant "Taverne 8", in reference to a number he used to wear on his shirt as a midfielder. The place is a popular meeting place for Yugoslav expatriate footballers in Belgium and surrounding countries.

Challenge Šljivo Tournament
The Indoor tournament, largest of its kind in Europe, carrying his name, "Challenge Šljivo", with seniors Futsal competition as a main event, is organized in his honor in Marche-en-Famenne, during pre-New Year Eve week for over three decades. Tournament comprises several competitions in Indoor varieties of Association football, for all categories and age. It takes place at Wallonie Expo S.A. (WEX) venue, in Marche-en-Famenne, on eight pitches. Qualifying rounds of the competitions including more than 400 teams and 5.000 football players, while games are followed up to 40.000 spectators in attendance. In final round 72 qualified teams take part. Tournament is very popular, with final game being in live broadcast in Belgium by public TV service.

Family
Edhem Šljivo's brother Mehmed was also a football player. He played for Edhem’s FK Sarajevo bitter city rivals, in the "blue side of the city", FK Željezničar Sarajevo.

References

External links
Challenge Šljivo

Profile - DFB

1950 births
Living people
Footballers from Sarajevo
Association football midfielders
Yugoslav footballers
Yugoslavia international footballers
UEFA Euro 1976 players
1982 FIFA World Cup players
FK Sarajevo players
RFC Liège players
OGC Nice players
1. FC Köln players
Yugoslav First League players
Belgian Pro League players
Ligue 1 players
Bundesliga players
Yugoslav expatriate footballers
Expatriate footballers in Belgium
Yugoslav expatriate sportspeople in Belgium
Expatriate footballers in France
Yugoslav expatriate sportspeople in France
Expatriate footballers in Germany
Yugoslav expatriate sportspeople in Germany